Papestra cristifera is a species of cutworm or dart moth in the family Noctuidae. It is found in North America.

The MONA or Hodges number for Papestra cristifera is 10312.

References

Further reading

 
 
 

Hadenini
Articles created by Qbugbot
Moths described in 1858